The Bosnian and Herzegovinian records in swimming are the fastest ever performances of swimmers from Bosnia and Herzegovina, which are recognised and ratified by the Swimming Association of Bosnia and Herzegovina.

All records were set in finals unless noted otherwise.

Long Course (50 m)

Men

Women

Mixed relay

Short Course (25 m)

Men

Women

Mixed relay

References
General
Bosnian and Herzegovinian Long Course Records – Men 8 March 2023 updated
Bosnian and Herzegovinian Long Course Records – Women 8 March 2023 updated
Bosnian and Herzegovinian Short Course Records – Men 8 January 2023 updated
Bosnian and Herzegovinian Short Course Records – Women 8 January 2023 updated
Specific

External links
Plivanje Info: Bosnian records
Bosnian Records swimrankings.net 18 December 2022 updated

Bosnia and Herzegovina
Records
Swimming
Swimming